Sinđelići is a Serbian television drama comedy which started on October 14, 2013. Sinđelići is an adaption of Los Serrano.

Plot  
Lila and Sreten getting married and begin to live with their children from their first marriage. Lila has two daughters, and Sreten has three sons. But things do not go as they planned. Family Sinđelić make Sreten, his brothers Jezdimir "Jezda" and Momčilo (season 2) and Sreten's sons Metodije, Gojko and Kolja. After his first wife's death, Sreten married Lila, his girlfriend from adulthood. Lila has daughters Eva and Tereza, mother Ksenija and aunt Lidija (season 2). Sreten's best friend is Fedor "Feki" Ristić, and Lila's best friend is Nikolina "Niki" Ristić, Fedor's wife.

Cast

References 

Serbian drama television series
Television series about families
Television shows set in Belgrade
Fictional Serbian people
Television shows filmed in Belgrade
Prva Srpska Televizija original programming